Kate Brooke, Lady Lovegrove is a British screenwriter.

Origins, education and early career
Brooke is the daughter of the late Timothy Sergison-Brooke and the Hon. Mary Anne Hare (b. 9 April 1936), eldest daughter of John Hare, 1st Viscount Blakenham. She was educated at Wycombe Abbey School and Christ Church, Oxford, where she read English. After Oxford, she studied at L'École Internationale de Théâtre Jacques Lecoq in Paris before setting up her own theatre group in England.

While working in the theatre, she adapted a number of works for the stage, including:
Graham Greene’s The Tenth Man
François Mauriac’s Thérèse Desqueyroux
Guy de Maupassant’s Bel Ami
Saki’s Beasts and Super-Beasts

Writing credits

Awards and nominations

Personal life

Brooke is married to Sir Stephen Lovegrove, a senior civil servant and currently the UK's National Security Adviser. They have two daughters and live in London.

References

External links
 
 

British screenwriters
British television writers
Alumni of Christ Church, Oxford
People educated at Wycombe Abbey
Living people
L'École Internationale de Théâtre Jacques Lecoq alumni
Year of birth missing (living people)
British women television writers
Wives of knights